The Ambassador Extraordinary and Plenipotentiary of the Russian Federation to the Socialist Republic of Vietnam is the official representative of the President and the Government of the Russian Federation to the President and the Government of Vietnam.

The ambassador and his staff work at large in the Embassy of Russia in Hanoi. There are consulates general in Da Nang and Ho Chi Minh City.

History of diplomatic relations

Diplomatic relations at the mission level between the Soviet Union and North Vietnam were first established in January 1950.  The first ambassador, was appointed on 11 August 1954, and presented his credentials on 4 November 1954. Diplomatic relations with South Vietnam were established in June 1969 and carried out through the Soviet embassy in Burma. Between 4 June 1973 and 27 December 1976 the Soviet ambassador to Burma, was concurrently accredited as Soviet ambassador to South Vietnam. With the reunification of North and South Vietnam in July 1976 the ambassador to North Vietnam, continued as ambassador to the Socialist Republic of Vietnam. With the dissolution of the Soviet Union in 1991, the Soviet ambassador, Rashit Khamidulin, continued as representative of the Russian Federation until 1996.

List of representatives (1954 – present)

Representatives of the Soviet Union to North Vietnam (1954 – 1976)

Representatives of the Soviet Union to South Vietnam (1973 – 1976)

Representatives of the Soviet Union to Vietnam (1976 – 1991)

Representatives of the Russian Federation to Vietnam (1991 – present)

References

External links

 
Vietnam
Russia